Pachygastrinae is a subfamily of flies in the family Stratiomyidae.

Genera
Abiomyia Kertész, 1914
Abrosiomyia Kertész, 1914
Acanthinomyia Hunter, 1901
Acyrocera Lindner, 1937
Acyrocerops James, 1978
Adraga Walker, 1858
Ageiton Kertész, 1914
Aidomyia Kertész, 1916
Alliophleps Becker, 1908
Anargemus Lindner, 1965
Ankylacantha Lindner, 1955
Anomalacanthimyia Woodley, 2001
Apotomaspis Lindner, 1972
Argyrobrithes Grünberg, 1915
Artemita Walker, 1854
Artemitomima James, 1948
Ashantina Kertész, 1914
Aspidacantha Kertész, 1916
Aspidacanthina Lindner, 1966
Asyncritula Strand, 1929
Aulana Walker, 1864
Berkshiria Johnson, 1914
Bistinda Bezzi, 1928
Blastocera Gerstaecker, 1857
Borboridea Kertész, 1916
Brachyodina Lindner, 1949
Burmabrithes Lindner, 1937
Caenacantha Wulp, 1885
Camptopteromyia Meijere, 1914
Cardopomyia Kertész, 1916
Cechorismenus Kertész, 1916
Chalcidomorphina Enderlein, 1914
Charisina Lindner, 1951
Chelonomima Enderlein, 1914
Chlamydonotum Lindner, 1949
Chorophthalmyia Lindner, 1964
Cibotogaster Enderlein, 1914
Clarissimyia Woodley, 2001
Cosmariomyia Kertész, 1914
Craspedometopon Kertész, 1909
Culcua Walker, 1856
Cyclotaspis Lindner, 1964
Cynipimorpha Brauer, 1882
Dactylacantha Lindner, 1964
Dactylodeictes Kertész, 1914
Dactylotinda Lindner, 1965
Damaromyia Kertész, 1916
Diademophora Lindner, 1955
Dialampsis Kertész, 1916
Diargemus Kertész, 1916
Diastophthalmus Lindner, 1949
Diplephippium Speiser, 1908
Diplopeltina Lindner, 1972
Dochmiocera Hardy, 1922
Drosimomyia Kertész, 1916
Ecchaetomyia Lindner, 1949
Eicochalcidina Lindner, 1964
Eidalimus Kertész, 1914
Engicerus Lindner, 1964
Enypnium Kertész, 1914
Eufijia Bezzi, 1928
Eupachygaster Kertész, 1911
Evaza Walker, 1856
Gabaza Walker, 1858
Glochinomyia Kertész, 1916
Gnesiomyia Kertész, 1914
Gnorismomyia Kertész, 1914
Goetghebueromyia Lindner, 1938
Gowdeyana Curran, 1928
Haplofijia Bezzi, 1928
Hermetiomima Grünberg, 1915
Hexacraspis Enderlein, 1914
Hypoceromys Lindner, 1935
Hypselophrum Kertész, 1909
Isomerocera Enderlein, 1914
Keiseria Lindner, 1980
Kolomania Pleske, 1924
Lampetiopus Lindner, 1936
Lasiodeictes Lindner, 1964
Lenomyia Kertész, 1916
Leveromyia Lindner, 1937
Ligyromyia Kertész, 1916
Lonchegaster White, 1914
Lophoteles Loew, 1858
Lyprotemyia Kertész, 1909
Maackiana Krivosheina, 1973
Madagascara Lindner, 1936
Madagascarina Lindner, 1967
Manotes Kertész, 1916
Marangua Lindner, 1960
Meristocera Lindner, 1964
Meristomeringina James, 1952
Meristomerinx Enderlein, 1914
Monacanthomyia Brunetti, 1912
Mycterocera James, 1967
Myiocavia Lindner, 1949
Neoacanthina Kertész, 1914
Neochauna Williston, 1896
Neopachygaster Austen, 1901
Netrogramma Lindner, 1964
Nyplatys Séguy, 1938
Obrapa Walker, 1858
Ornopyramis Krivosheina, 1973
Otionigera Lindner, 1966
Oxymyia Kertész, 1916
Pachyacantha Lindner, 1952
Pachyberis James, 1975
Pachygaster Meigen, 1803
Panacridops James & Woodley, 1980
Panacris Gerstaecker, 1857
Pangomyia James, 1978
Paracanthinomyia Lindner, 1964
Paracechorismenus Kertész, 1916
Paradraga James, 1980
Parastratiosphecomyia Brunetti, 1923
Parevaza James, 1978
Pedinocera Kertész, 1909
Pedinocerops James, 1980
Pegadomyia Kertész, 1916
Peltina Lindner, 1964
Peratomastix Enderlein, 1914
Pithomyia Kertész, 1916
Platylobium Lindner, 1933
Platyna Wiedemann, 1824
Platynomorpha Grünberg, 1915
Platynomyia Kertész, 1916
Popanomyia Kertész, 1909
Pristaspis Bezzi, 1928
Proegmenomyia Kertész, 1914
Psapharomys Grünberg, 1915
Psephiocera Enderlein, 1914
Pseudocyphomyia Kertész, 1916
Pseudomeristomerinx Hollis, 1963
Pseudoxymyia Lindner, 1959
Ptilinoxus Lindner, 1966
Ptilocera Wiedemann, 1820
Raphanocera Pleske, 1922
Rosapha Walker, 1859
Rosaphula Frey, 1934
Salduba Walker, 1858
Saldubella Kertész, 1916
Saruga Walker, 1859
Sathroptera Kertész, 1914
Sphaerofijia Bezzi, 1928
Steleoceromys Grünberg, 1915
Sternobrithes Loew, 1856
Stratiosphecomyia Brunetti, 1913
Strobilaspis Lindner, 1949
Strophognathus Lindner, 1955
Synaptochaeta Lindner, 1964
Tegocera Lindner, 1964
Thopomyia Kertész, 1916
Thylacognathus Kertész, 1916
Tinda Walker, 1859
Tindacera Lindner, 1961
Toxopeusomyia Lindner, 1957
Trichochaeta Bigot, 1878
Trigonocerina Lindner, 1964
Vittiger Kertész, 1909
Weimyia James, 1978
Xylopachygaster Krivosheina, 1973
Zabrachia Coquillett, 1901

References

External links
http://tolweb.org/Pachygastrinae/23958

Stratiomyidae
Diptera of Africa
Diptera of Asia
Diptera of Australasia
Diptera of Europe
Diptera of North America
Diptera of South America
Brachycera subfamilies